Encyclia citrina (or tulip orchid) is a species of orchid with a strong lemon fragrance. Its petals are golden yellow with varying degrees of white crenulations in the lip. The plant may be upright or pendant, but the flowers are always pendant. It is also known as the tulip orchid due to its flowers' rounded cup-like shape. It has been referred to for generations as costicoatzontecoxòchitl, meaning "flower in the form of yellow serpent head", by the Nahuas (indigenous peoples of southwestern United States and northwestern Mexico).

Morphology 
E. citrina is epiphytic and has pendant plants and flowers. The foliage is very noticeable with a fine powdery "film" over the leaves.

Flowers 
The flowers are grouped as an inflorescence  in length, one to two large. Its blooms are pale yellow to canary yellow or almost orange with fleshy sepals and petals. Its petals are similar but a little wider. Its lip is more or less the same length, with darker veins and ruffled texture, united with the column at the base. The outer lip is somewhat variable and may be lighter or darker than the petals and sepals. The ovaries are free of any sharp angles or wings, while its pods are rounded and ribbed.

Distribution 
E. citrina grows on trees in mixed oak-pine forests in central and southern Mexico.

 Guerrero: Leonardo Bravo.
 Jalisco: Mascota.
 Michoacán: Madero.
 Oaxaca: Mpio. San Pedro Juchatengo, Santo Domingo Albarradas, Dto. Teposcolula.

References

External links 

citrina
Orchids of Mexico
Flora of Guerrero
Flora of Jalisco
Flora of Michoacán
Flora of Oaxaca
Epiphytic orchids
Flora of the Sierra Madre del Sur